Cave of the Living Dead is a 1964 German / Yugoslav horror film directed by Ákos Ráthonyi.

Plot 
The local police in a sleepy mountain village in the Balkans are left at a loss after seven murders of women. Therefore, Interpol is asked to send an expert. His name is Inspector Frank Doren and he's an American. Doren finds that every time the power goes out in the village, a girl dies. After that, the corpses disappear. As soon as he arrived, the electricity went out again; even Doren's car won't start anymore. This time Maria is the victim, the cook of the inn where he stayed. Despite his attempts to disguise himself as a tourist, the entire village community soon knows that Doren was sent by Interpol, which doesn't make his job any easier.

Doren continues his investigations, several more or less bizarre inhabitants are suspicious: for example the innkeeper who tried to make Maria docile the night before the last murder, or the obscure village doctor who after every post-mortem examination despite clear bite wounds at the young women's throats, stereotypically insisting on his heart failure diagnosis. Even the deaf, dumb Thomas is quite nocturnal in an unseemly way, and an old fortune teller babbles about alleged vampires who are supposed to be roaming the area. They all have one thing in common: they are afraid of an ominous grotto near the village.

The village community is also very afraid of the mysterious Professor von Adelsberg, who is said to be working on a scientific study on the subject of "blood" at his high castle. At his service is the young, pretty assistant Karin Schumann. It doesn't take Frank Doren long to find out that the cultivated nobleman with the aura of the uncanny is behind the mysterious events. Doren quickly takes a liking to the professor's assistant and they both fall in love. He soon realizes that Karin is in great danger, as her boss is the wanted vampire who has the dead women on his conscience. With the help of Adelsberg's black servant John, they can locate the vampire's coffin in the stalactite cave below the castle. There he made the seven allegedly murdered women docile as undead vampires. Before the undead fiend can rise again for a new bloody deed, Doren impales him with a wooden stake. Adelsberg's decomposing body bursts into flames in a small explosion.

Cast 
 Adrian Hoven - Insp. Frank Dorin
 Erika Remberg - Maria, the Professor's Assistant
 Carl Möhner - The Village Doctor
 Wolfgang Preiss - Prof. von Adelsberg
 Karin Field - Karin Schumann
 Emmerich Schrenk - Thomas - the Deaf One
 John Kitzmiller - John - Black Servant

References

External links 

1964 films
1960s German-language films
West German films
Mad scientist films
German vampire films
German supernatural horror films
1960s supernatural horror films
Films directed by Ákos Ráthonyi
1960s exploitation films
Yugoslav horror films
1960s German films